David Hembrow (born 2 June 1947) is a British former swimmer. He competed in the men's 4 × 100 metre freestyle relay at the 1968 Summer Olympics.

References

External links
 

1947 births
Living people
British male swimmers
Olympic swimmers of Great Britain
Swimmers at the 1968 Summer Olympics
Sportspeople from Taunton
British male freestyle swimmers
20th-century British people